The Nathan Frye House is a historic house in Andover, Massachusetts.  The large mansion was built in 1851-52 for Nathan Frye, who had recently (1849) become president of the Marland Mill Company, one of Andover's major textile firms.  It features grand Italianate details, including bracketed eaves, corner quoins, and pedimented gables.  The building and its associated carriage house have been extensively altered for commercial purposes in the late 20th century, but much of the architectural interest has been retained.

The house was listed on the National Register of Historic Places in 1982.

See also
National Register of Historic Places listings in Andover, Massachusetts
National Register of Historic Places listings in Essex County, Massachusetts

References

Houses in Andover, Massachusetts
National Register of Historic Places in Andover, Massachusetts
Houses on the National Register of Historic Places in Essex County, Massachusetts